The 2017 Sofia Open (also known as 2017 Garanti Koza Sofia Open for sponsorship reasons) was a tennis tournament played on indoor hard courts. It was the 2nd edition of the Sofia Open as part of the ATP World Tour 250 series of the 2017 ATP World Tour. It took place at the Arena Armeec in Sofia, Bulgaria, from February 5–12.

Points and prize money

Point distribution

Prize money

Singles main-draw entrants

Seeds

1 Rankings as of January 30, 2017

Other entrants
The following players received wildcards into the singles main draw:
  Cem İlkel 
  Dimitar Kuzmanov 
  Alexandar Lazarov

The following players received entry from the qualifying draw:
  Mathias Bourgue
  Daniel Brands
  Maximilian Marterer
  Cedrik-Marcel Stebe

The following players received entry as lucky losers:
  Teymuraz Gabashvili
  Marko Tepavac

Withdrawals
Before the tournament
  Nicolás Almagro →replaced by  Marco Chiudinelli
  Marcos Baghdatis →replaced by  Teymuraz Gabashvili
  Philipp Kohlschreiber →replaced by  Marko Tepavac 
  John Millman →replaced by  Radu Albot

Doubles main-draw entrants

Seeds

1 Rankings as of January 30, 2017

Other entrants
The following pairs received wildcards into the doubles main draw:
  Tuna Altuna /  Cem İlkel
  Dimitar Kuzmanov /  Alexandar Lazov

Withdrawals
Before the tournament
  Marcos Baghdatis

Champions

Singles 

  Grigor Dimitrov def.  David Goffin, 7–5, 6–4

Doubles 

  Viktor Troicki /  Nenad Zimonjić def.  Mikhail Elgin /  Andrey Kuznetsov, 6–4, 6–4

External links 
Official website
Tournament page at ATPWorldTour.com

References 

2017
Sofia Open
Sofia Open